The Saudi Arabian–Kuwaiti neutral zone, also known as the Divided Zone, was an area of  between the borders of Saudi Arabia and Kuwait that was left undefined when the border was established by the Uqair Convention of 2 December 1922.

According to Daniel Yergin, "The Neutral Zone was the two thousand or so square miles of barren desert that had been carved out by the British in 1922 in the course of drawing a border between Kuwait and Saudi Arabia.  In order to accommodate the Bedouins, who wandered back and forth between Kuwait and Saudi Arabia and for whom nationality was a hazy concept, it was agreed that the two countries would share sovereignty over the area."

In the area, which was later called the "Neutral Zone" or "Divided Zone", the Uqair Convention stated that "the Government of Najd and Kuwait will share equal rights until through the good offices of the Government of Great Britain a further agreement is made between Najd and Kuwait concerning it".

However, there was little interest in a more definitive settlement in the so-called "Neutral Zone" until the discovery, in 1938, of oil in the Burgan (Burqan) of Kuwait. With the possibility of oil discovery within the "Neutral Zone" itself, concessions were granted in 1948–1949 by each government to Aminoil and Pacific Western Oil Corporation.  Oil was discovered in March 1953. Later the two countries exploited the oil under a joint operating agreement.

In 1957, Saudi Arabia signed a concession agreement with the Japanese-owned Arab Oil Co., and Kuwait signed in 1958.  That concession expired in 2000.  The company made its first offshore discovery in January 1960.

The partitioning negotiations commenced shortly after the rulers of Kuwait and Saudi Arabia met and decided, in October 1960, that the Neutral Zone should be divided. On 7 July 1965, the two governments signed an agreement (which took effect on 25 July 1966) to partition the Neutral Zone adjoining their respective territories. A demarcation agreement dividing the Neutral Zone was signed on 17 December 1967 but did not formally take effect until the exchange of instruments and signing which took place in Kuwait on 18 December 1969. Ratification followed on 18 January 1970, and the agreement was published in the Kuwaiti Official Gazette on 25 January 1970.

The zone was never assigned an ISO 3166 code since it was partitioned before the adoption of ISO 3166 in 1974.

The area was quickly, but briefly, overrun during the First Gulf War by the Iraqi forces in 1991 after they invaded and occupied Kuwait; however, Coalition forces composed of American and Saudi contingents repelled the Iraqi offensive and liberated the area and the rest of Kuwait.

Despite the zone being half-century gone, oil pumping is still done by agreements.

In December 2022, Saudi Aramco and Kuwait Gulf Oil Company signed a Memorandum of Understanding to jointly develop the Durra gas field, located in the neutral zone. The development aims at producing 1 billion cubic feet of gas and 84,000 barrels of LNG per day.

See also
 Geography of Kuwait
 Geography of Saudi Arabia
 Kuwait–Saudi Arabia border
 Kuwait–Saudi Arabia relations
 Saudi Arabian–Iraqi neutral zone
 Unification of Saudi Arabia

References

External links
 
 
  U.S. Army Map Sheet NH38-16 1:250.000 (map sheet with western part of former Neutral Zone)

Kuwait neutral zone
History of Kuwait
Disputed territories in the Persian Gulf
Territorial disputes of Saudi Arabia
Kuwait–Saudi Arabia border
Kuwait–Saudi Arabia relations
Demilitarized zones
1922 establishments in Asia
1970 disestablishments in Asia